The 2017 Intrust Super Cup was the PNG Hunters fourth season in the Queensland Cup and they also won their first premiership title that year.

Season Summary

The PNG Hunters won their first ever minor premiership and went on to claim their maiden premiership edging out the Sunshine Coast Falcons in the grand final 12-10. They then advanced to the NRL State Championship final against the NSW Cup champions Penrith Panthers where they were beaten 42-18 in Sydney on NRL Grand final day. Ten of their players were selected in the 23-man PNG Kumuls squad for the 2017 Rugby League World Cup.

2017 squad

Squad movement

Gains

Losses

References

2017 in Papua New Guinea rugby league
2017 in Australian rugby league
2017 in rugby league by club
Papua New Guinea Hunters